Pfaudler, Inc. is an American multinational company best known for the invention of glass-coated steel, its successful commercialization and the subsequent production of storage tanks, reactors and other vessels for the brewing and chemical process industries. Pfaudler manufactures glass and fluoropolymer-lined reactors and components for the chemical and pharmaceutical industries. Pfaudler was founded in the US in 1884 and set up a production plant in Schwetzingen, Germany to circumvent export costs.

Although at one time an independent company, Pfaudler has been acquired by a succession of holding companies, including the Process Solutions Group of National Oilwell Varco, an American multinational public company.

Pfaudler in turn has independent locations / engineering / manufacturing facilities in Asia, Europe, North America and South America.

In December 2014, German firm Deutsche Beteiligungs AG acquired Pfaudler from National Oilwell Varco, with a view to setting up a subsequent co-investment with the management to support a management buyout.

In India, Pfaudler partnered with Gujarat Machinery Manufacturers (GMM) for a joint venture, before acquiring a 40% stake in the company in 1987. Pfaudler raised its stake to 51% in 1999 and renamed the company as GMM Pfaudler. GMM Pfaudler manufactures glass-lined reactors as well as non-glass-lined equipment for pharmaceutical and chemical companies. It has a market share of 60 percent in glass-lined equipment in India. In August 2020, GMM Pfaudler announced that it will purchase a majority stake in Pfaudler Group from Deutsche Beteiligungs.

References

External links
 

History of Rochester, New York
Manufacturing companies established in 1884
Multinational companies headquartered in the United States
Manufacturing companies based in Rochester, New York
1884 establishments in New York (state)
Companies listed on the National Stock Exchange of India